Port Moody is a city in British Columbia, Canada, and a member municipality of the Metro Vancouver Regional District. It envelops the east end of Burrard Inlet and is the smallest of the Tri-Cities, bordered by Coquitlam on the east and south and by Burnaby on the west. The villages of Belcarra and Anmore, along with the rugged Coast Mountains, lie to the northwest and north, respectively. It is named for Richard Clement Moody, the first lieutenant governor of the Colony of British Columbia.

History
The Coast Salish people were the first to live in this area, and archaeology confirms continuous occupation of the territory for at least 9,000 years. Other First Nations to live in the area are Musqueam, Squamish, Stó:lō and Tsleil-Waututh.

Port Moody is named for Colonel Richard Clement Moody, of the Royal Engineers. It was established at the end of a trail that connected New Westminster with Burrard Inlet to defend New Westminster from potential attack by the US. After 1859, the town grew rapidly following land grants to Moody's Royal Engineers after the sapper detachment was disbanded in 1863.

The construction of a transcontinental railroad was the condition that prompted British Columbia to enter into confederation in 1871. The small town received little attention until it was declared the terminus of the Canadian Pacific Railway in 1879.

By 1881, the survey of Port Moody had begun. Both John Murray Sr. and Jr. assisted and, in fact, it was John Murray Jr. who named many of the streets after members of his family. The population grew rapidly through the early 1880s. Andrew Onderdonk was the contractor who, under government contract, built  of line from Port Moody, via Hope, Yale and Savona. Onderdonk built a large wharf and receiving area and started rail construction from Port Moody in 1883. The line was finished in 1885. As the Western Terminus of the CPR, almost everyone had high hopes that Port Moody would become a major West Coast metropolis.

The railway was completed with the last spike driven at Craigellachie on November 7, 1885, and a train arriving at Port Moody the next day. The first scheduled passenger transcontinental train arrived on July 4, 1886, a date that is still celebrated during Golden Spike Days. Real estate prices soared but soon fell flat when a  branch line was built westward along the inlet to Vancouver in 1887.

While many people lost a great deal of money and moved on, others, including real estate tycoon and ship captain James A. Clarke, and several lumber mills, decided to remain. On April 7, 1913, Port Moody's Council met for the first time as a city.

Governance and politics

Federal
The City of Port Moody is located entirely in the Federal riding of Port Moody—Coquitlam and is represented in the House of Commons of Canada by Member of Parliament Bonita Zarrillo.

Provincial
The City of Port Moody is located entirely in the Provincial electoral district of Port Moody-Coquitlam and is represented in the Legislative Assembly of British Columbia by Rick Glumac.

Municipal
Port Moody's City Council consists of Mayor Meghan Lahti, Councillors Samantha Agtarap, Diana Dilworth, Kyla Knowles, Dr. Amy Lubik, Haven Lurbiecki, and Callan Morrison. School Trustees representing Port Moody are Lisa Park and Zoë Royer.

Climate

Demographics

In 2006, 8,015 residential dwellings were owned, while 2,115 were rented. 45% of Port Moody residents were legally married, 6.25% were in common-law relationships, 5.72% were divorced and 24% were single. Thirty percent of residents identified themselves as immigrants, slightly higher than the 27% Canadian average.

Ethnicity

Note: Totals greater than 100% due to multiple origin responses.

Languages
Mother languages as reported by each person:

Religion 
According to the 2021 census, religious groups in Port Moody included:
Irreligion (19,160 persons or 57.3%)
Christianity (11,570 persons or 34.6%)
Islam (1,310 persons or 3.9%)
Buddhism (385 persons or 1.2%)
Hinduism (300 persons or 0.9%)
Judaism (215 persons or 0.6%)
Sikhism (80 persons or 0.2%)
Indigenous Spirituality (20 persons or 0.1%)

Education 
Port Moody is served by School District 43, which offers two public high schools (Heritage Woods Secondary School and Port Moody Secondary School), two middle school and seven elementary schools.

Simon Fraser University is located in nearby Burnaby, while Douglas College maintains a campus in Coquitlam Town Centre.

Port Moody's public library is located in the City Hall complex.

Geography and the environment
Over 41 streams flow through Port Moody to Burrard Inlet. The City of Port Moody Stream Stewardship Program manages urban streams, streamside vegetation and watersheds to support the production of fish and insect life for present and future generations. The Port Moody Ecological Society (PMES), a not-for-profit organization, works alongside the city to promote ecological awareness in the area. PMES volunteers operate a salmon and trout hatchery, a water quality lab and public awareness & community outreach programs.

The city has also banned the use of pesticides and holds annual seminars on how to garden naturally at its Inlet Theatre. City Hall has been pesticide free since 1988.

Port Moody won a large number of provincial, national and international awards. In 2004, the city received a prestigious award from the UN sponsored International Awards for Liveable Communities in the category Planning for the Future. The city also received third place overall for cities of its size.

Economy
The traditional industrial sector in Port Moody is characterized by a deep-sea bulk loading terminal, two petrochemical distribution operations, a large wood products manufacturer, and a thermal electric generating station. Light industry, home-based business, and crafts and cultural businesses are also common in Port Moody, along with a growing health and social services sector.

Port Moody's economic development focus in recent years has been on the arts and culture sector, including the development of a new Port Moody identity as the “City of the Arts.” An estimated 6% of employment in Port Moody is in arts and culture sector, which is one of the highest concentrations of arts and culture employment in the region.

In 2008, the Canadian Federation of Independent Business highlighted Port Moody as the most fiscally responsible of British Columbia's 28 largest cities.

Largest employers
In 2014, Port Moody's single largest employer was Eagle Ridge Hospital, with 927 employees, followed by the City of Port Moody (686 employees) and School District 43 (525 employees).

Media
In addition to Vancouver-based media outlets, Port Moody is served by the Tri-City News community newspaper. Local FM radio station CKPM-FM is based in Port Moody and serves the Tri-Cities (and beyond) at 98.7 MHz.

Transportation

As part of Metro Vancouver, Port Moody is connected to the TransLink public transit system by way of numerous bus routes. It also has the first station on the West Coast Express commuter rail line outside downtown Vancouver. The Millennium Line's Evergreen Extension, part of TransLink's SkyTrain system, links Port Moody with Coquitlam to the east and Burnaby and Vancouver in the west. In August 2018, U-bicycle launched a dockless bicycle sharing system in the city. Additionally, Modo has five vehicles located in Port Moody available for carsharing. As of June 2019, seven Level 2 electric vehicle charging stations were located in Port Moody, with the capacity for 14 vehicles.

Sports

Arts
On June 16, 2004, Port Moody was officially trademarked as the “City of the Arts.” Historically, Port Moody was a destination for artists because of its low rent, scenery and ambient lighting. Today, it is home to annual festivals, arts groups and diverse facilities that help foster a creative community.

The Port Moody Arts Centre offers a number of fine arts and photography classes for residents of all ages, and has three diverse art galleries that feature a number of constantly changing works. The Port Moody Station Museum hosts a wide assortment of artifacts from Port Moody's past, and has restored a heritage train venosta for tours. Arts Connect is an organization that connects artists from the Tri-Cities (Coquitlam, Port Coquitlam and Port Moody), and hosts regular artists’ circles. Artists can find studio space in Port Moody at 2709 Esplanade, with open house tours taking place every year in April.

Festivals held in Port Moody include the Canadian Film Festival (February), the Festival of the Arts (September), Rotary Ribfest (July) Search for The Perfect Pint (May) Summer Sundays Concerts, Golden Spike Days (July), the Wearable Art Awards (annually) and the CP Rail Holiday Train (December). Port Moody is also home to the Inlet Theatre, an intimate 200-seat venue.

Service clubs include the Rotary Club of Port Moody. It is responsible for community events that include the Annual RibFest and Search for the Perfect Pint.

Recreation

Port Moody is home to Rocky Point Park. At  in size, the park has hiking trails, a newly renovated spray park, a skate park, a bike trials park, a playground, a picnic shelter, a boat launch and a recreational pier. Home to Golden Spike Days, the park is a summer destination.

Bert Flinn Park encompasses  of largely undeveloped parkland on former industrial lands. Used by mountain bikers, and with an extensive unmarked trail system along old logging roadbeds, the park also has an off-leash dog walk.

Old Orchard Park is another destination in Port Moody. It has a sandy beach, picnic shelter with barbecues and an adventure playground in a quiet park setting. Old Orchard Hall is also located here and is used for weddings and other special events.

Freedom of the City
The following people and military units have received the Freedom of the City of Port Moody:

Individuals
 Leonard A. Elsdon: 4 January 1971.
 Herbert C. "Bert" Flinn: 31 March 1980.
 William A. "Bill" Johnstone: 10 September 1982.
 Andrew Peller: 10 September 1982.
 Norman Wild: 3 September 1985.
 Judith D. Forst: 27 November 1992.
 Al and Nellie Sholund: 13 June 1998.
 David Driscoll: 29 May 1999.
 Ann C. Hulbert: 2003.
 Arthur "Art" Wilkinson: 2003.
 Dr. Elaine Golds: 2007.
 Ronald "Ron" Curties: 2011.
 Dr. Mary Anne Cooper: 2011.
 Penelope “Ann” Kitching: 2 December 2013.
 Gerry Nuttall: 16 June 2018.

Military units
 The Royal Canadian Legion (Port Moody Branch 119): 16 October 2005.

See also

 Coat of arms of Port Moody
 Port Moody Station Museum
 Canadian Pacific Railway
 Rocky Point Park
 Port Moody Secondary School
 NewPort Village
 Heritage Woods Secondary School

Notes

References

External links

 
Cities in British Columbia
Populated places in Greater Vancouver